Kris Atteberry is an American baseball broadcaster. He joined John Gordon and Dan Gladden as the pre- and post-game host and backup play-by-play broadcaster for the Minnesota Twins Radio Network in 2007. Prior to joining the Minnesota Twins, Atteberry was the radio and television voice of the independent minor league St. Paul Saints for five seasons. He has also called football and basketball games for Montana State University.

A native of Bozeman, Montana, Atteberry is a 1996 graduate of Stanford University with a degree in English literature.

References

External links
Kris Atteberry broadcaster biography
Twins Radio Network
Feature article in Hotchkiss Magazine

Living people
Radio in Minnesota
Major League Baseball broadcasters
Minnesota Twins announcers
Stanford University School of Humanities and Sciences alumni
College football announcers
College basketball announcers in the United States
People from Bozeman, Montana
Year of birth missing (living people)